Operation Hong Kil Dong (홍길동작전) was the largest South Korean operation of the Vietnam War. The 48-day-long operation was claimed by South Korea as  a major success as they claimed to have thwarted People's Army of Vietnam (PAVN)/Viet Cong (VC) infiltration into friendly areas. The results of the operation were a claim of a kill ratio of 24:1 in the Korean's report primarily killed by heavy artillery, aerial bombardment and B-52 Arclight strikes : 638 PAVN/VC. 98 crew-served and 359 individual weapons were found in the aftermath.

Vietnam veterans such as Commander of the ROK Army Forces in Vietnam and the Chief of Staff of the ROK Army, General Chae Myung-shin, and Colonel (Retired) Choi Hee Nam, wrote about Operation Hong Kil Dong in their Vietnam War memoirs.

See also
Military history of South Korea during the Vietnam War

References

Conflicts in 1967
1967 in Vietnam
Battles of the Vietnam War involving South Korea
Battles involving Vietnam
Military operations involving Vietnam
Battles and operations of the Vietnam War in 1967
July 1967 events in Asia
August 1967 events in Asia
History of Phú Yên Province